The Red Banner Caucasus Army was a Soviet army existing from 1921 to 1935. The army was named the Independent Caucasus Army on its creation, and carried this name until August 1923, when it was renamed the Red Banner Caucasus Army. It ceased to exist on May 17, 1935 when it was redesignated as the Transcaucasian Military District in connection with the overall reorganization of the Red Army.

The army consisted of 6 territorial divisions, an air force, and some reserve troops.

History
The army was established at the end of May 1921 from the 11th Army, a unit of the Caucasus Front, which was dissolved on May 29, 1921. The army unified the territorial forces of the Transcaucasian Soviet Federated Socialist Republic (but in reality was under the control of the Russian Soviet Federated Socialist Republic, and later of the Soviet Union).

At a meeting of the Presidium of the Central Executive Committee of the USSR on 17 August 1923, it was moved and passed to award the Independent Caucasus Army the Order of the Red Banner and rename it the Red Banner Caucasus Army.

Units of the Red Banner Caucasus Army, together with units of the OGPU, were involved in fighting partisans, mainly in Chechnya and Dagestan, in the years 1921-1933.

Reason for dissolution
Amid a perceived increasing threat of armed aggression against the USSR, the old mobilization doctrine and structure of the Red Army was found not optimal for meeting these threats.

On May 17, 1935, the military and administrative system of the Red Army was radically changed. Instead of 8 military districts and 2 separate armies, 13 military districts were created: Moscow, Leningrad, Belarus, Kiev, Kharkov, North Caucasus, Transcaucasia, Central Asia, Volga, Urals, Siberia, Transbaikalia, and Far East.

In almost all of these new districts the composition of the territorial armies was also changed. Replacing the former distinction between "border" and "interior" districts, a new designation of districts as "front" (combat) or "rear" (administrative) was made. It was assumed that the "front" districts would bear the brunt of any fighting, and the "rear" districts would provide reinforcements and logistical support. For each front district there would be two rear districts.

Composition
Six territorial infantry divisions:
1st Georgian Division
2nd Georgian Division
1st Caucasus Infantry Division (formed on June 8, 1922, by combining the 1st and 2nd Caucasus Brigades)
3rd Caucasus Infantry Division
Azerbaijan Infantry Division
Armenian Infantry Division

Auxiliary units:
Air Force of the Red Banner Caucasus Army
Mechanized and armored units of the Red Banner Caucasus Army

Commanders
Anatoliy Gekker: May–June 1921
Semyon Pugachov: June 10, 1921 - July 12, 1923
Alexander Ilyich Yegorov: February 1922 - April 1924
Semyon Pugachov: April 1924 - February 1925
August Kork: February 1925 - November 13, 1925
Mikhail Karlovich Lewandowski: 1925 — 1928
Konstantin Avksentevsky: October 20, 1928 - 1931
Ivan Fedko: 1931 - 1932
Ivan Smolin: 1932
Mikhail Karlovich Lewandowski: November 1933 - 1935. Became the first commander of the successor organization, the Transcaucasian Military District.

References

Sources
10 years of the Red Banner Of The Caucasus Army Tbilisi: 1931
Red Banner Transcaucasus: A Short History of the Red Banner Transcaucasian Military District Tbilisi: 1981
ITU February 1935 edition Col 124

Field armies of the Soviet Union